Stoned Cold Country is a tribute album to the Rolling Stones featuring covers performed by country music artists. It was released on March 17, 2023 by This Is Hit and was produced by Robert Deaton.

Background 
The album, made to celebrate the Stones' 60th anniversary as a band, will feature country artists such as Eric Church, Maren Morris, and Ashley McBryde, covering the band's songs. The project was helmed and produced by Robert Deaton, who called the album "country music's thank you to the Rolling Stones for 60 years of inspiration and providing the soundtrack of our lives." Deaton said the album, and his country music-centered career, were partly inspired by the Stones, explaining that he heard Ronnie Milsap live cover of "Honky Tonk Women" from 1976 and believed it to be "one of the greatest country music songs of all time."

The lead single, Brothers Osborne and the War and Treaty's rendition of "It's Only Rock 'n Roll (But I Like It)", released November 4. The second single, Elvie Shane's cover of "Sympathy for the Devil", was released January 13. Lainey Wilson's version of "You Can't Always Get What You Want" was released as the third single on February 17. The fourth single, Jimmie Allen's version of "Miss You", was released on March 3, 2023.

Production 
Per BMG Rights Management CEO Hartwig Masuch, Deaton sold him on the album over "three bottles of white wine" at a dinner in Los Angeles. BMG own the publishing rights to Mick Jagger and Keith Richards' songwriting. Deaton confirmed that Jagger and Richards gave their blessing to the project personally, though it wasn't needed. With that, he began the process of selecting artists. He listened to the Stones' songs "over and over, 100 times" so he good decide which songs to pair with which artists, with Masuch setting no rules on who he chose or how many had to be BMG signees. Only three BMG artists – Elvie Shane, Lainey Wilson, and Jimmie Allen – made the cut. Deaton allowed Zac Brown to choose "Paint It Black" for his band to record. All musicians recorded live without click tracks. The songs were recorded in various Nashville-area studios.

Promotion 
The War and Treaty and the Brothers Osborne performed their "It's Only Rock 'n Roll" cover together at the 2022 CMA Awards, with the show's co-host Luke Bryan introducing the performance and album.

Style 
The album is said not to make pure country out of the Stones' catalogue, but to bring together country artists who have a rock and roll bent and have them stay close to the original songs, just with added steel guitar.

Reception 
Varietys Chris Willman wrote that not all fourteen songs pay off, but "highlights abound" including Church, Wilson, Little Big Town, and blues rock musician Marcus King.

Track listing

Personnel

Musicians 

"(I Can't Get No) Satisfaction"
 Chris Harris – acoustic guitar
 Danny Rader – electric guitar, Hammond B3 organ
 Matt Helmkamp – electric guitar
 Christian Sancho – bass
 Quinn Hill – drums
 Maureen Murphy and Nickie Conley – backing vocals

"Honky Tonk Women"
 Kix Brooks and Ronnie Dunn – lead vocals
 Danny Rader – acoustic guitar
 Kenny Greenberg and Rob McNelley – electric guitar
 Michael Rhodes – bass
 Miles McPherson – drums
 Gary Morse – steel guitar
 Maureen Murphy and Nickie Conley – backing vocals

"Dead Flowers"
 Danny Rader – acoustic guitar, backing vocals
 Steve Mackey – bass
 Greg Morrow – drums
 Rob McNelley – electric guitar
 Mike Rojas – Hammond B3 organ, piano
 Mike Johnson – steel guitar

"It's Only Rock 'n Roll (But I Like It)"
 John Osborne and Kenny Greenberg – electric guitar
 Danny Rader – acoustic guitar
 Michael Rhodes – bass
 Greg Morrow – drums
 Mike Rojas – keyboards
 Sam Levine – baritone saxophone, tenor saxophone
 Roy Agee – trombone
 Mike Haynes – trumpet

"Miss You"
 Danny Rader – acoustic guitar
 Kenny Greenberg – electric guitar
 Michael Rhodes – bass
 Greg Morrow – drums
 Mike Rojas – keyboards
 Mickey Raphael – harmonica
 Maureen Murphy and Nickie Conley – backing vocals

"Tumbling Dice"
 Adam Shoenfeld and Jerry McPherson – electric guitar
 Michael Rhodes – bass
 Evan Hutchings – drums
 Mike Rojas – Hammond B3 organ, piano
 Dan Dugmore – steel guitar
 Maureen Murphy and Nickie Conley – backing vocals

"Can't You Hear Me Knocking"
 Marcus King – lead vocals, electric guitar
 Drew Smithers – electric guitar
 Stephen Campbell – bass
 Jack Ryan – drums
 Mike Runyon – keyboards
 Christopher Spies – saxophone
 Justin Johnson – trumpet, trombone, tambourine, shaker
 Maureen Murphy and Nickie Conley – backing vocals

"Wild Horses"
 Jimi Westbrook, Karen Fairchild, Kimberly Schlapman, and Philip Sweet – vocals
 Kris Donegan – acoustic guitar
 Rob McNelley – electric guitar
 Eli Beaird – bass
 Evan Hutchings – drums
 Akil Thompson – Hammond B3 organ, piano
 Paul Franklin – steel guitar

"Paint It Black"
 Zac Brown – lead vocals, nylon-string guitar
 Coy Bowles – electric guitar
 John Hopkins – electric guitar, backing vocals
 Matt Mangano – bass
 Chris Fryar – drums
 Caroline Jones – bouzouki, backing vocals
 Clay Cook – Hammond B3 organ, piano, backing vocals
 Daniel de los Reyes – percussion
 Jimmy de Martini – violin, backing vocals
 Paul Franklin – steel guitar

"You Can't Always Get What You Want"
 Danny Rader – acoustic guitar
 Rob McNelley – electric guitar
 Steve Mackey – bass
 Greg Morrow – drums
 Mike Rojas – keyboards
 Dan Dugmore – steel guitar
 Maureen Murphy, Nickie Conley, and Nikki Conley – backing vocals

"Sympathy for the Devil"
 Danny Rader – acoustic guitar
 Sam Levine – baritone saxophone, tenor saxophone
 Rob McNelley and Tom Bukovac – electric guitar
 Steve Mackey – bass
 Gordon Mote – Hammond B3 organ, piano
 Glen Caruba and Oscar Charles – percussion
 Roy Agee – trombone
 Mike Haynes – trumpet

"Angie"
 Caleb Miller – acoustic guitar
 Michael Rhodes – bass
 Chris Deaton – drums
 Mike Rojas – keyboards
 Paul Franklin – steel guitar
 Ilya Toshinskiy – mandolin
 Jenee Fleenor – fiddle

"Gimme Shelter"
 Eric Church and Joanna Cotten – vocals
 Jay Joyce – acoustic guitar, keyboards, percussion
 Driver Williams and Jeff Hyde – acoustic guitar
 Jeff Cease and Rob McNelley – electric guitar
 Lee Hendricks – bass
 Craig Wright – drums
 Billy Justineau – keyboards

"Shine a Light"
 Danny Rader – acoustic guitar
 Kenny Greenberg – electric guitar
 Michael Rhodes – bass
 Nick Buda – drums
 Gordon Mote – Hammond B3 organ
 Chuck Leavell – piano
 Jimmy Bowland – baritone saxophone, tenor saxophone
 Jeff Coffin – tenor saxophone
 Ray Mason – trombone
 Mike Haynes and Tyler Jaeger – trumpet
 April Rucker, Devonne Fowlkes, Kristen Rogers, and Maureen Murphy – backing vocals

Technical 
 Robert Deaton – producer
 Danny Rader – producer
 Marcus King – producer (7)
 Oscar Charles – producer (11)
 Jay Joyce – producer (13)
 Mike "Frog" Griffith – project coordinator
 Court Blankenship – project coordinator (13)
 Sam Levine – arranger (4, 5, 11)
 David Hamilton – arranger, conductor (14)
 Dan Davis, Evan Wilber, Hank Bachara, Pete Lyman, Michael Walter, Jordan Reed, Brandon Towles, Michelle Freetly, Reid Shippen, Austin Brown, Steve Marcantonio, Jason Hall, Jay Joyce, Jimmy Mansfield, Josh Groppel, Joel McKenney – engineers

References 

2023 compilation albums
Various artists albums
The Rolling Stones tribute albums
BBR Music Group compilation albums